Charon i Luren tutar (Charon blows his horn) is epistle No. 79 in the Swedish poet and performer Carl Michael Bellman's 1790 song collection, Fredman's Epistles. The epistle is subtitled "Afsked til Matronorna, synnerligen til Mor Maja Myra i Solgränden vid Stortorget, Anno 1785" (Farewell to the Matrons, especially to Mother Maja Myra in Solgränd by Stortorget, Anno 1785). The song describes Jean Fredman's departure from the world.

The ferryman of the underworld in classical mythology, Charon, invites Fredman to come with him, suggesting to some scholars that Fredman had already died and crossed the River Styx, but had wandered back to his old haunts in Stockholm. Even as Charon fetches him, he drinks a mug of ale, a liquid that is ascribed almost magical properties; it runs down his clothes, so that before death Fredman is baptised in beer, recalling to scholars the sponge soaked in sour wine that refreshes Jesus on the cross. Scholars have noted the presence of the figure of Death in the epistle, accompanying his last revelries.

Context

Song

Music 

The song is in  time and is marked Menuetto, a tune for a courtly dance. It has 5 verses, each consisting of 17 lines. The rhyming pattern is ABAC-ABAC-DD-EEFFGG-C; the song was written in 1785 or soon afterwards. No source for the melody has been discovered.

Lyrics 

The epistle is subtitled "Afsked til Matronorna, synnerligen til Mor Maja Myra i Solgränden vid Stortorget, Anno 1785" (Farewell to the Matrons, especially to Mother Maja Myra in Solgränd by Stortorget, Anno 1785). It describes Fredman's departure from the world, with allusions to Charon, who ferried the dead to the underworld in classical mythology.

Reception and legacy

Bellman's biographers, the scholar of literature Lars Lönnroth and Carina Burman, both devote substantial sections of their respective accounts of Fredman's Epistles to No. 79.

Lönnroth writes that from the earliest epistles, the figure of Death was present amongst the Bacchanalian tumult of drinking brothers and attractive sisters. In epistle 79, he appears as Charon, the dour ferryman of the underworld who carries souls across the River Styx, never to return. The epistle's approach resembles that of one of the oldest, epistle 24 Kära syster! (Dear Sister), which also speaks of Charon and is similarly addressed to a tavern's landlady, who Fredman hopes will give him some brandy before he dies. The later epistle, however, goes much further in describing the storm that breaks out around Fredman's impending death, echoing Bellman's own storm narrative in Bacchi Tempel or the depiction of catastrophe in Bengt Lidner's best-known poem "Spastaras död" (Spastara's death). The account is both apocalyptic and everyday, familiar verbs like "tutar" ("hoots") undermining the high-sounding rhetoric. Meanwhile, the melody, which may well be one of the few that Bellman composed rather than adapted, contributes to the unnerving effect with dissonant chords and sudden intervals. The boundary between what Lönnroth calls "hallucinatory fantasy" and reality is quite unclear; in the second verse, Fredman tries to adjust his tavern credit note with the landlady, a seemingly earthy matter, but it might symbolise his book of sins, a serious concern that Bellman makes comic. Then Fredman, again in high spirits, sets up his will and renounces worldly things, before quickly turning to praise for the pub's beer. The fourth stanza is tragicomic, as in epistle 23, Ack du min moder (Alas though my mother), Fredman despairs over the condition in which he is going to face death. In the final stanza, the doomsday mood returns, and Fredman stands in Charon's ferry in a tremendous thunderstorm, before the stars go out and death's agony begins. In the last line, Fredman cheerfully wishes the landlady good night ("God natt Madame!") and goes to meet his fate. Lönnroth remarks that death may have triumphed, but Fredman is not wholly destroyed.

Burman comments in her biography that Fredman takes his fictional departure in the epistle. The real watchmaker Jean Fredman was in fact already dead (he died in 1767), but now in 1785 death has caught up with his fictional alter ego. Burman writes that just as Shakespeare lets the whole of nature react to Macbeth's regicide, so Bellman has the storms, the moon and the stars revolve around Fredman. Both men, she states, knew their bible, and there are echoes here of Matthew's "and the earth did quake, and the rocks rent". As so often, Bellman combines mythology and realism. Even with one foot in Charon's boat, Fredman drains his last mug of ale. New ale, or "wort" as Bellman calls it, is ascribed almost magical life-giving properties; it overflows and runs down Fredman's clothes, so that before death he is baptised in beer, recalling to Burman the sponge soaked in sour wine that the Roman soldiers offered to Jesus on the cross: "[Fredman] the apostle of brandy is sacrificed for us", and the epistle ends with nature in uproar. 
All the same, Burman writes, Fredman isn't quite finished. His epistles end with No. 80 Liksom en Herdinna (As a shepherdess), the bravura pastorale; No. 81 Märk hur vår skugga (Mark how our shadow) "dictated at the grave" where Charon can be seen waving, and finally No. 82 Hvila vid denna källa (Rest by this spring), which is stated to be a departure. Burman notes that where epistle No. 79's farewell is dark and apocalyptic, epistle 82's is its bright counterpart, with music, green grass, and Ulla Winblad's beauty around the dying Fredman.

The scholar of Swedish language  drew attention to a curious feature of the epistle, as also of epistles No. 3 (Fader Berg i hornet stöter) and No. 58 (Hjertat mig klämmer), namely that Charon keeps coming to find Fredman. She noted that the literary and theatre critic  had suggested in the 1960s that the reason for this was that Fredman had already crossed the Styx and had returned to haunt his favourite places; Charon had then come to take him back to the underworld where he belonged.

Epistle 79 has been recorded by Sven-Bertil Taube on his 1987 album Fredmans Epistlar och Sånger; and by the actor Mikael Samuelson on his 1988 album C. M. Bellman. It has been translated into English by Eva Toller in 2009 and by John Irons in 2020.

References

Sources 

 
 
 
  (contains the most popular Epistles and Songs, in Swedish, with sheet music)
  (with facsimiles of sheet music from first editions in 1790, 1791)

External links 

 Text of Epistle 79 at Bellman.net

1785 compositions
Swedish songs
Fredmans epistlar